The Dennis O'Keefe Show is an American sitcom produced by Cypress Production/United Artists Television which aired on CBS for sponsor General Motors' Oldsmobile division. It was not a ratings success during its original run and was canceled after one season. The series was largely forgotten until a "Best Of" DVD release by Alpha Video during 2004. Certain episodes of the show can also be seen at the Internet Archive. It appears this series has entered the public domain.

Premise
Dennis O'Keefe portrays Hal Towne, a widower who is trying to balance his career as a newspaper columnist ("All Around Towne") and raise his 9-year-old son, Randy, in an apartment in New York City, with the help of a tough but lovable housekeeper, Amelia Sargent, better known as "Sarge", played by Hope Emerson.

The series aired at 8 p.m. Eastern on Tuesdays, with competition from the last half of two hour-long western series, Laramie on NBC and Sugarfoot and Bronco, alternating on ABC, one of their many Warner Brothers offerings at that time.

Broadcasting history
September 22, 1959—June 7, 1960: Tuesday at 8 p.m. on CBS.

DVD release
Alpha Video released a budget DVD with 4 episodes on November 23, 2004. They have yet to release more volumes.

Cast
 Dennis O'Keefe as Hal Towne
 Hope Emerson as Amelia "Sarge" Sargent
 Ricky Kelman as Randy Towne
 Eloise Hardt as Karen Hadley
 Eddie Ryder as Eliot

Episodes

Personnel 
John Fenton Murray created the program, and Les Hafner was the producer. Abby Berlin, Jerry Hopkins, James V. Kern, and Don Weis were directors. Writers included Bob Fisher, Benedict Freedman, Robert Gottlieb, Seaman Jacobs, Joel Kane, Alan Lipscott, Jack Michael, Murray, and Si Rose.

References

External links
 

CBS original programming
1959 American television series debuts
1960 American television series endings
1950s American sitcoms
1960s American sitcoms
Television shows set in New York City
Black-and-white American television shows
Television series by United Artists Television